Clásico Regiomontano, Clásico Regio, Clásico del Norte or Clásico Norteño is a football derby in Nuevo Leon, Mexico, between crosstown rival teams Monterrey and Tigres. Since the first Clásico in 1974, the two teams have competed over 100 times for bragging rights and city honour. It is known for being one of the most intensely competed derbies in Mexican football, even being regarded by people in the city of Monterrey and Northern Mexico as the most important Mexican derby. The match is the biggest game of the season in Monterrey, and every year, fans wait in line for days outside the stadium just to get tickets, which are often priced at two or three times their regular value.

As of August 2018, Monterrey and Tigres have the most expensive squads in the Liga MX.

Record

MP = Matches Played; W = Wins; D = Draws; L = Losses; GF = Goals for; GA = Goals against; Dif = Goal Difference

 Clásico 28 was suspended without result

Historical results

Notable Clásicos
 Clásico 1. The first Clásico Regiomontano. 13 July, 1974 saw the first game Tigres played in the First Division with Monterrey, and resulted in a tie. Result: Tigres 3–3 Rayados.
 Clásico 2. The first victory went to Monterrey, with a score of 2–1. Nilo Acuna scored at the 44th and Alfredo Jimenez at the 89th minute. Tigres’ rather late goal was made by Alberto Rodriguez at the 92nd minute.
 Clásico 12 and 13. The first Clásico in the playoffs. With the first leg on 6 June, and the second leg on 16 June 1979, Tigres and Rayados met in the playoffs for the first time, although this was not a direct elimination instance. In the 1978–79 season, league playoffs were played in an elimination "group-stage" format, in which, after league elimination, two groups of four teams were formed and the leader of each group advanced to the final. Tigres and Rayados were in Group 2, along with Pumas and Zacatepec. Both games were played in the Estadio Universitario. Tigres won Clásico 12 with a goal by Mantegazza at the 18th minute. Clásico 13 ended with a draw by 1–1, in which Rayados' Raúl Isiordia scored first, at the 8th minute, only to be tied at the 40th by Gerónimo Barbadillo. With these results, Tigres managed to tie for first place with Pumas on the group leaderboard, but were not able to qualify to the final due to goal difference.
 Clasico 23. Rayados wins after six years. On 17 September 1983, Rayados defeated Tigres at their stadium after six years without winning, since 5 February 1977. Tigres held at the time what was the longest undefeated streak in these Clásicos.
 Clásico 51. What is known as the “Relegation Clásico”. Tigres had three poor seasons, being one of the worst teams in Mexico. It was a done deal that Tigres would be relegated to Primera División A, but to confirm it, they only needed to lose one more game. The last game in which Tigres saw that remote possibility to stay in the First Division was at Clásico 51 on 24 March 1996, in which, with goals by Sergio "El Pibe" Verdirame and Luis Miguel Salvador, Monterrey won with a score of 2–1, sealing Tigres’ fate of competing in Primera A the following season. 
Clasico 61. Run over Rayados with six goals. On 26 February 2000, Tigres visited Rayados at their stadium. Tigres outplayed Monterrey and scored six goals. Rayados claimed that there was an irregularity with the signature on the contract of Osmar Donizete. The game was eventually annulled. 
 Clásico 71 . The "4 a 1". On 4 June 2003, was the first time that Tigres and Rayados met in the playoff semifinals. There was a sense that whoever won this semifinal would have been the favourite for the championship. Tigres started the first game well, scoring very early 1–0, but 4 unanswered goals by Rayados turned the tide in the game and in the Semifinals.
 Clásico 75 . Six goals again. Tigres visited Rayados and humiliated them in their own stadium with a score of 6–2. Tigres scored 6 goals in a derby for the second time.
 Clásico 79. Another semifinal encounter. Tigres was victorious in the first game (Clásico 78) 1–0 in the Estadio Universitario. For the second game, Rayados won 2–1, Defender Claudio Suárez saw the red card in a play that gave Rayados a penalty and the goal lead. Rayados defeated Tigres with a goal by Guillermo "El Guille" Franco as the game neared the 90 minute mark. This was the 2nd time in which Rayados advanced to the championship final games at the expense of Tigres.
Clásico 80. It was the first time that a Clásico Regio was played outside the country. In the finals of the Interliga 2006, held at the Home Depot Center in Carson, California, Tigres defeated Monterrey by 2–1.
 Clásico 99. Rayados defeats Tigres for the third time in direct-elimination playoffs. Tigres finished the regular season as the leader with 35 points and only 2 defeats in the regular season. One of their two defeats was against Monterrey at Clasico 97. Initially, Monterrey did not qualify for the playoffs, ending the regular season in the ninth place. Queretaro F.C. finished in eight place and was meant to be the playoff opponent of Tigres, but was relegated to Ascenso MX because the team had accumulated the lowest point coefficient in the last 2 years. The situation with Queretaro was able to get Monterrey off the hook as they were the next eligible team to travel to the playoffs. At Clasico 98, the away leg of the playoffs, Monterrey defeated Tigres 1–0 at the Estadio Tecnologico, in a close game that Tigres controlled most of the time. In the second leg, Tigres needed to win by 1–0, or by a difference of two goals because of the away goals rule (which means they needed to finish the game 3–1, 4–2, 5–3 in their favour to advance). Tigres came out aggressive and Danilinho scored a goal early on in the game. Minutes later, with a game totally handled by Tigres, Israel Jimenez scored an own goal that tied the game 1–1, for an aggregate of 2–1 that would send Tigres packing. 
Clásico 100. The 100th edition of the Clásico Regiomontano. Tigres painfully lost the Clásico 99 by way of an own goal of Israel Jimenez and was eliminated from the playoffs by Monterrey. Because of these woes, Tigres was eager for a chance to redeem themselves. Both teams started aggressive but Tigres had the first chance and a young Alan Pulido scored a header which would set the score to 1–0 after a long pass by Jesús Dueñas. After a mistake by Hugo Ayala, Humberto Suazo tied the game 1–1. Pulido scored again to make it 2–1 for Tigres. In the second half, Tigres controlled the game and captain Lucas Lobos scored the final 3–1, effectively getting their redemption after losing in the playoffs. 
Clásico 101. Quarterfinals at the Copa MX. After a 0–2 lead for Tigres at the end of the first half, César Delgado entered as a substitute and turned things around for Monterrey by making it 1–2 and assisting the goal that levelled the score on the 93rd minute—a dramatic header from Luis Madrigal. This forced penalty kicks without extra time, as per Copa MX rules. Rayados scored 4 out of 4 penalty kicks. Tigres' first shot was held by Rayados' goalkeeper Juan de Dios Ibarra, and Manuel Viniegra hit the crossbar on their last shot for a final score of 4–2 for Monterrey.
 Clásico 115 2017 saw the first ever Clasico Regiomontano in the finals of the Liga MX. Tigres and Rayados would tie 1–1 in Tigres home stadium thanks to an early goal by Nicolás Sánchez and a Panenka from Enner Valencia. In the second leg, Rayados played against Tigres in their home stadium, the Estadio BBVA having never been beaten at home since Tigres beat them 2–0 in the quarterfinals of the 2017 Clasura playoffs. An early goal by Dorlan Pabon would be irrelevant as Tigres would score twice thanks to goals by Eduardo Vargas and Francisco Meza. The game would end 1–2 with Tigres winning 3–2 aggregate and winning their sixth Liga MX championship as well as bragging rights in the first ever Clasico Regiomontano finals.
 Clásico 119 & 120 The Clasico Regiomontano goes global. This was the first Clasico Regiomontano played in an international tournament, at the finals of the 2019 CONCACAF Champions League. The final was contested in two-legged home-and-away format. The first leg was hosted by Tigres UANL at the Estadio Universitario in San Nicolás de los Garza on 23 April 2019, while the second leg was hosted by Rayados de Monterrey at the Estadio BBVA Bancomer in Guadalupe on 1 May 2019. Monterrey won the finals 2–1 on aggregate for their fourth CONCACAF Champions League title and prevented Tigres from winning the CONCACAF Champions League for the third time after losing the 2015-16 and 2016-17 editions to America and Pachuca respectively. Tigres would finally go on to win the CONCACAF Champions League in 2020, whilst Monterrey is still credited as the first winner of the derby in the finals of that competition.

Notable players

Most appearances

27, Jesús Arellano, Rayados player with the most Clásicos played and the best regiomontano in history.
26, "El Jefe" Tomás Boy, Tigres player with the most Clásicos played.
16, Francisco Javier "El Abuelo" Cruz, one of the few players to be successful with both Tigres and Rayados.

Most goals
11, Mario de Souza Mota "Bahía", leading goalscorer for Monterrey and the whole derby.
10, André-Pierre Gignac, leading goalscorer for Tigres in the derby.  
8, Walter Gaitán, “El Chueco”
8, Claudio "El Diablo" Nuñez

Other famous players
Luis "El Matador" Hernandez, the first player to have scored with both teams, first with Monterrey.
Sebastián "El Loco" Abreu, the first foreign player (born in Uruguay) to have scored with both teams, first with Rayados and most known in Rayados.
Gaston Fernandez, the second foreign player (born in Argentina) to have scored with both teams, first with Rayados.
Aldo de Nigris, the first player to have scored first with Tigres in a derby and then with Rayados. He is also the first player that was born in the city of Monterrey to score for both teams.
Luis Rodríguez, the first player ever to become champion with both teams. Chaka first became champion of Liga MX with Monterrey in 2010 with few games played. With Tigres has won Liga MX in 2016 and 2017.

Notable managers
Carlos Miloc, managed Tigres and never lost an official Clásico Regiomontano for a total of 13 undefeated games
Victor Manuel Vucetich, managed both teams, having two stints with Tigres to varying degrees of success. With Tigres, he won the Copa Mexico in '96 but was relegated from the Liga MX that season. With Monterrey, he won the Liga MX twice and the CONCACAF Champions League thrice.
Ricardo Ferretti, “El Tuca”, former player for Monterrey in the 86–87 season, and former manager of Tigres in three different periods:  2000–2003, 2006 and 2010–2021. His third tenureship has been his most successful winning five Liga MX titles (Apertura 2011, Apertura 2015, Apertura 2016, Apertura 2017 and Clausura 2019) and three campeón de campeones titles (2016, 2017, 2018)
Antonio Mohamed, “El Turco”, former player and manager for Monterrey, known for his large frame, spiked blond hair, and for winning a Liga MX and two Copa MX titles with Monterrey. It was under Mohamed that Monterrey got to play the first Clasico Regio as a competition final against a Tigres team led by Ferretti.

References

Football rivalries in Mexico
Tigres UANL
C.F. Monterrey
1974 establishments in Mexico